Polly Annika Mack (born 26 February 1999) is a German professional golfer and member of the LPGA Tour and Ladies European Tour. She won the 2023 LET Q-School at La Manga.

Amateur career
In 2016, Mack was the German National Champion and won the RB German Junior Championship, to finish first in the German Junior Golf Tour rankings.

Mack competed for the German National team between 2017 and 2021. She appeared at the European Ladies' Team Championship three times, finishing 5th in 2018 and 4th in 2019.

Mack accepted an athletic scholarship to the University of Nevada, Las Vegas and played with the UNLV Rebels women's golf team for two seasons between 2017 and 2019. She had an outstanding freshman campaign and became the first Rebel to earn both Mountain West Player and Freshman of the Year honors in the same season. She recorded two career individual tournament wins. 

She then transferred to the University of Alabama and played with the Alabama Crimson Tide women's golf team for three seasons between 2019 and 2022. In 2022, she won twice and played in the NCAA Division I Women's Golf Championships, after she became the first Crimson Tide player to win an NCAA regional since Stephanie Meadow in 2013.

Professional career
Mack turned professional after graduating in 2022 and joined the Epson Tour mid-season. She made eight cuts in 11 events and finished 32nd in the rankings, recording two top-10s including a season-best solo third place at the French Lick Charity Championship. She finished 4th at the Amundi German Masters, tied with Linn Grant, two strokes behind Maja Stark.

Mack secured a place on the 2023 LPGA Tour by finishing T15 at Q-Series and on the 2023 Ladies European Tour by winning the LET Q-School at La Manga in Spain, alongside compatriot Alexandra Försterling.

Amateur wins
2016 RB German Junior, German National Amateur
2019 Battle at Boulder Creek I, Mountain View Collegiate
2022 Liz Murphey Collegiate Classic, NCAA Franklin Regional

Source:

Team appearances
Amateur
European Ladies' Team Championship (representing Germany): 2018, 2019, 2021

Source:

References

External links

German female golfers
LPGA Tour golfers
Ladies European Tour golfers
UNLV Rebels women's golfers
Alabama Crimson Tide women's golfers
Sportspeople from Berlin
1999 births
Living people
21st-century German women